Jack Owen Spillman III (born August 30, 1969)  is an American serial killer from Spokane, Washington. He is known as the Werewolf Butcher.

Crimes
Spillman was convicted of the April 1995 murders of Rita Huffman, 48, and her daughter Mandy, 15, and the 1994 murder of Penny Davis, 9.

Huffman and her daughter were both found in their East Wenatchee, Washington, home, sexually mutilated and posed in provocative positions. Spillman's black pickup truck matched the description of a vehicle seen in a parking lot near the victims' home on the night of the murder. Also, Spillman's pickup was stopped by an East Wenatchee police officer in the parking lot of a VFW hall nearby that evening, and subsequently, a 12-inch knife covered in blood was recovered there. It appeared to match a knife set in the victims' house. Before his arrest, Spillman was kept under surveillance for a week while laboratory tests were performed. 

Under threat of the death penalty, Spillman later would admit to killing Davis, of Tonasket, Washington. Six months after her September 1994 disappearance, her body had been found in a shallow grave some twelve miles from her home. She also had been posed in a provocative position. 

To avoid a possible death sentence, Spillman pleaded guilty to three counts of first degree murder, and was sentenced to life in prison in 1996. He is serving his sentence at Washington State Penitentiary.

Prior criminal history
According to court documents, "Spillman would declare to [cellmate Mark] Miller that he wanted to be the world’s greatest serial killer". At the time that he pleaded guilty to the three murders, reports stated that Spillman was facing additional charges of first-degree rape, robbery, and burglary. He and a friend were arrested for rape in 1993, but those charges were eventually dropped.

In Media 
The case was covered by two Investigation Discovery tv shows:

 In 2015 Most Evil analyzed his crimes in an episode titled Predators. He was ranked at level 22, the highest rank on the scale.
 In 2020 Spillman's two sisters (April Steele and May Sullivan) told their experience about "Roy" in an episode of Evil Lives Here.

See also 
 List of serial killers in the United States

References

External links
 A couple of pages of this article deal with Spillman; it is a more overall look at the werewolf issue in crime.

1969 births
20th-century American criminals
American male criminals
American murderers of children
American people convicted of murder
American prisoners sentenced to life imprisonment
American rapists
American serial killers
Criminals from Washington (state)
Living people
Male serial killers
People convicted of murder by Washington (state)
People from Spokane, Washington
Prisoners sentenced to life imprisonment by Washington (state)